Rory Markham (born March 25, 1982) is an American professional mixed martial artist and actor who most recently acted alongside Will Smith playing Booker Grassie in the latest addition to the Bad Boys franchise Bad Boys for Life. Formerly, Rory competed in the Welterweight, Middleweight and Light Heavyweight Divisions. A professional competitor since 2003 Markham has formerly competed for the UFC and the IFL

Background
An experienced martial artist from a young age, Markham began training in Shidokan Karate at the age of six before later transitioning into Kenpo. At the age of 13, Markham began training in Kyokushin and began fighting in full-contact competitions when he was 15, winning all of his matches by knockout despite often being paired against much older opponents. Markham also began competing in boxing at the age of 17, holding an undefeated amateur record of 10-0. Markham later became affiliated with Pat Miletich.

Mixed martial arts career

Early career
In 2003, Markham made his professional mixed martial arts debut, winning via first-round knockout. Markham would go on to compile a record of 8-2, competing in the regional circuit, before being invited to compete in the International Fight League for the Quad Cities Silverbacks, under his coach at the Miletich Fighting Systems, Pat Miletich.

IFL
Markham made his IFL debut at IFL: Legends Championship 2006 on April 29, 2006, against veteran Mike Pyle. Markham won in 44 seconds via knockout.

Markham followed this up with three more wins in the promotion all via KO/TKO over Brad Blackburn, Marcelo Acevedo, and Keith Wisniewski, respectively, before facing future UFC veteran Chris Wilson at the IFL: Championship Final. Markham was handed his first defeated inside of the promotion via TKO in the first round. Markham soon bounced back with two more knockout wins over Pat Healy and Chris Clements, respectively, before being defeated via second-round knockout at the hands of Brett Cooper at the IFL: World Grand Prix Finals.

Post-IFL
After the demise of the IFL, Markham fought for Adrenaline MMA's inaugural event on June 14, 2008, facing veteran Jay Ellis. Markham won via triangle choke submission in the first round.

UFC
With an overall 15-4 professional record, Markham was signed by the UFC. Markham made his debut at UFC Fight Night 14 on July 19, 2008 against Canadian Brodie Farber. After almost being finished early on in the fight, Markham knocked out Farber with a head kick. This victory earned him a Knockout of the Night award and was a nominee on Sherdog.com for "Knockout of the Year" and "Comeback of the Year".

In his next appearance, Markham faced British fighter Dan Hardy at UFC 95 on February 20, 2009 in London, England. Markham was knocked out with a left hook in the first round. Markham was then expected to face Martin Kampmann at UFC 108 on January 2, 2010, but pulled out due to a knee injury.

Markham then fought at UFC 111 on March 27, 2010 against Nate Diaz. After Markham was six pounds overweight at the weigh-ins, the fight was made a catchweight bout 177 lbs and was fined $1,000 as a result. This was significant as it was only the second time a fighter training with the Miletich Fighting Systems didn't make weight in 15 years. Markham was defeated via TKO in the first round and was released by the promotion.

Post-UFC
After being released from the UFC, Markham signed with Bellator and was expected to make his promotional debut at Bellator 26 against Steve Carl on August 26, 2010 for a spot in the Season Four Welterweight Tournament. However, Markham pulled out due to not being cleared to fight.

Markham was next expected to face Rudy Bears at Titan FC 18 on May 27, 2011 but withdrew from the fight. Markham was most recently scheduled to fight on June 16, 2012 against Jon Kirk at Battle Xtreme Championship but the fight was cancelled.

Rory Markham spends his time updating his own wikipedia page. Markham isn’t impervious to the inner demons that often torment the heart of artists. Being arrested several times between 2012-2015 for alcohol related arrested. Markham completed 5 month rehab in 2013. Coming out of the haze and enjoying his talents again Markham
Says “it’s gets dark down there but I know I just have to keep getting up no matter what and God will provide the platform. As long as I continue to use what my creator has given me, my life will be full. If along the way I can inspire those that believe hope is lost and show the way out of the mental basement; Then my life wil truly have purpose and all was never lost.”

Film
Markham is a trained actor and member of the Screen Actors Guild. His films include The Death and Life of Bobby Z with Paul Walker and Laurence Fishburne; The Experiment with Adrien Brody and Forest Whitaker; Setup with Bruce Willis, 50 Cent, and Ryan Phillippe; and Alex Cross with Tyler Perry and Matthew Fox.

Filmography

Mixed martial arts record

|  Win
|align=center| 17–6
|  Brian Green
| TKO (punches)
| XFO 58
| 
|align=center| 1
|align=center| 1:06
|Lake Geneva, Wisconsin, United States
|Middleweight debut.
|- 
|  Loss
|align=center| 16–6
| Nate Diaz
| TKO (punches)
| UFC 111
| 
|align=center| 1
|align=center| 2:47
|Newark, New Jersey, United States
|Catchweight (177 lbs) bout. Markham missed weight.
|-
| Loss
|align=center| 16–5
| Dan Hardy
| KO (punch)
| UFC 95
| 
|align=center| 1
|align=center| 1:09
| London, England, United Kingdom
| 
|-
| Win
|align=center| 16–4
| Brodie Farber
| KO (head kick)
| UFC Fight Night 14
| 
|align=center| 1
|align=center| 1:37
|Las Vegas, Nevada, United States
| 
|-
| Win
|align=center| 15–4
|  Jay Ellis
| Submission (triangle choke)
| Adrenaline MMA 1
| 
|align=center| 1
|align=center| 1:57
|Chicago, Illinois, United States
| 
|-
| Loss
|align=center| 14–4
| Brett Cooper
| TKO (punches)
| IFL: World Grand Prix Finals
| 
|align=center| 2
|align=center| 1:15
|Uncasville, Connecticut, United States
| 
|-
| Win
|align=center| 14–3
| Chris Clements
| TKO (punches)
| IFL: 2007 Semifinals
| 
|align=center| 1
|align=center| 1:17
|East Rutherford, New Jersey, United States
| 
|-
| Win
|align=center| 13–3
| Pat Healy
| KO (punches)
| IFL: Moline
| 
|align=center| 3
|align=center| 1:47
|Moline, Illinois, United States
| 
|-
| Loss
|align=center| 12–3
| Chris Wilson
| TKO (punches)
| IFL: Championship Final
| 
|align=center| 1
|align=center| 2:14
|Uncasville, Connecticut, United States
| 
|-
| Win
|align=center| 12–2
| Keith Wisniewski
| TKO (corner stoppage)
| IFL: World Championship Semifinals
| 
|align=center| 3
|align=center| 4:00
|Portland, Oregon, United States
| 
|-
| Win
|align=center| 11–2
|  Marcelo Azevedo
| TKO (punches)
| IFL: Gracie vs. Miletich
| 
|align=center| 1
|align=center| 3:58
|Moline, Illinois, United States
| 
|-
| Win
|align=center| 10–2
| Brad Blackburn
| KO (punch)
| IFL: Championship 2006
| 
|align=center| 2
|align=center| 0:23
|Atlantic City, New Jersey, United States
| 
|-
| Win
|align=center| 9–2
| Mike Pyle
| KO (punch)
| IFL: Legends Championship 2006
| 
|align=center| 1
|align=center| 0:44
|Atlantic City, New Jersey, United States
| 
|-
| Loss
|align=center| 8–2
|  Trevor Garrett
| KO (punch)
| Xtreme Fighting Organization 10
| 
|align=center| 1
|align=center| 0:47
|Lakemoor, Illinois, United States
| 
|-
| Win
|align=center| 8–1
|  Brian Green
| KO (punches)
| Xtreme Fighting Organization 9
| 
|align=center| 1
|align=center| 0:26
|Lakemoor, Illinois, United States
| 
|-
| Win
|align=center| 7–1
|  Mike Van Meer
| KO (punches)
| Extreme Challenge 64
| 
|align=center| 1
|align=center| 1:48
|Osceola, Iowa, United States
| 
|-
| Win
|align=center| 6–1
|  Victor Moreno
| Submission (rear-naked choke)
| Extreme Challenge 61
| 
|align=center| 1
|align=center| 4:16
|Osceola, Iowa, United States
| 
|-
| Win
|align=center| 5–1
|  Jimmy Boyd
| Submission (triangle choke)
| Xtreme Fighting Organization 5
| 
|align=center| 1
|align=center| 2:13
|Lakemoor, Illinois, United States
| 
|-
| Win
|align=center| 4–1
|  James Warfield
| TKO (punches)
| Xtreme Fighting Organization 3
| 
|align=center| 2
|align=center| 1:12
|McHenry, Illinois, United States
| 
|-
| Win
|align=center| 3–1
|  Ryan Williams
| Submission (triangle choke)
| Courage Fighting Championships 1
| 
|align=center| 2
|align=center| 2:53
|Decatur, Illinois, United States
| 
|-
| Win
|align=center| 2–1
| Jason Guida
| Submission (armbar)
| Xtreme Fighting Organization 2
| 
|align=center| 2
|align=center| 0:58
|Fontana, Wisconsin, United States
| 
|-
| Loss
|align=center| 1–1
|  Kurt Illeman
| TKO (cut)
| Extreme Challenge 55
| 
|align=center| 1
|align=center| 1:26
|Lakemoor, Illinois, United States
| 
|-
| Win
|align=center| 1–0
|  John Bulger
| KO (punches)
| Extreme Challenge 54
| 
|align=center| 1
|align=center| 0:59
|Lakemoor, Illinois, United States
|

References

External links

Rory Markham IFL Page
International Fight League
UFC Profile

1982 births
Living people
Sportspeople from Chicago
American male mixed martial artists
Mixed martial artists from Illinois
Welterweight mixed martial artists
Mixed martial artists utilizing American Kenpo
Mixed martial artists utilizing Kyokushin kaikan
Mixed martial artists utilizing boxing
American male karateka
People from Bettendorf, Iowa
People from Crystal Lake, Illinois
Ultimate Fighting Championship male fighters